53rd New York Film Critics Circle Awards
January 24, 1988

Best Film: 
 Broadcast News 
The 53rd New York Film Critics Circle Awards honored the best filmmaking of 1987. The winners were announced on 17 December 1987 and the awards were given on 24 January 1988.

Winners
Best Actor:
Jack Nicholson - The Witches of Eastwick, Ironweed and Broadcast News
Runners-up: Michael Douglas - Wall Street and William Hurt - Broadcast News
Best Actress:
Holly Hunter - Broadcast News
Runners-up: Christine Lahti - Housekeeping and Maggie Smith - The Lonely Passion of Judith Hearne
Best Cinematography:
Vittorio Storaro - The Last Emperor
Best Director:
James L. Brooks - Broadcast News
Runner-up: John Huston - The Dead
Best Film:
Broadcast News
Runners-up: The Dead and Hope and Glory
Best Foreign Language Film:
My Life as a Dog (Mitt liv som hund) • Sweden
Best Screenplay:
James L. Brooks - Broadcast News
Runner-up: Tony Huston - The Dead
Best Supporting Actor:
Morgan Freeman - Street Smart
Runner-up: Sean Connery - The Untouchables
Best Supporting Actress:
Vanessa Redgrave - Prick Up Your Ears
Runners-up: Anjelica Huston - The Dead and Olympia Dukakis - Moonstruck

References

External links
1987 Awards

1987
New York Film Critics Circle Awards, 1987
New York Film Critics Circle Awards
New York Film Critics Circle Awards
New York Film Critics Circle Awards
New York Film Critics Circle Awards